The bartail jawfish (Opistognathus cuvierii) is a species of jawfish known only from reefs in the Atlantic Ocean off the coast of southern Brazil.  This species can reach a length of  SL. The specific name honours the French naturalist Georges Cuvier (1769-1832).

References

Bartail jawfish
Taxa named by Achille Valenciennes
Fish described in 1836